Baek Ok-dam (born May 24, 1986) is a South Korean actress. Her aunt is screenwriter Im Sung-han, and Baek has mostly starred in television dramas that Im has written, including Princess Aurora (2013) and Apgujeong Midnight Sun (2014).

Television series

References

External links

1986 births
Living people
South Korean television actresses